Nutwalls is a hamlet in Devon, England.

Two cottages built in the 18th century are listed buildings.

References

Hamlets in Devon